Syed Fida Hassan was a Pakistani bureaucrat and administrator who was the Chairman of the Pakistan Cricket Board (PCB) between 1963 and 1969.

Life and career
Syed Fida Hassan was born was born on December 4, 1908 in Dera Ghazi Khan. He was educated at the Rang Mahal Mission School and Government College, Lahore. He was admitted to the Indian Civil Service and was educated at the Oriel College, Oxford.

In 1954, he was appointed as the manager of Pakistan national cricket team for the tour of England.

Personal life
Syed Fida Hassan married Zeenat Hussain in 1934 who served as a member on a reserved women's seat in the Punjab Legislative Assembly from 1951 to 1955, and in the West Pakistan Assembly up to 1958. Her daughter, Anjum Niaz, was an American-Pakistani journalist who worked for Dawn.

References

1908 births
People from Dera Ghazi Khan District
Pakistan Cricket Board Presidents and Chairmen
Pakistani civil servants
Alumni of Oriel College, Oxford